Aiguo Road is a station on Line 12 of the Shanghai Metro in Yangpu District, Shanghai. It is located at the intersection of Aiguo Road and Changyang Road.

History 
 During the planning stages of Line 12, the station was named Neijiang Road, but it was renamed Aiguo Road.
 30 December 2008: the construction of Line 12 begins.
 29 December 2013: the construction of the east part of Line 12 (including Aiguo Road Station) is completed and this station officially opens.

Exits 
There are four exits of the station.

Exits 1 and 2: Changyang Road

Exits 3 and 4: Changyang Road and Neijiang Road

Places nearby 
The following points of interest are near the station:
 Youth's Amateur Football School of Shanghai
 College of Administration of Yangpu District, Shanghai

Structure of the station 

It is available to enter the station via escalator, elevator or stairs. After passing through the wicket with security check machines installed in front of it and going downstairs, the platform of Line 12 going two ways (toward Qixin Road and toward Jinhai Road) can be seen.

Gallery

References 

Railway stations in Shanghai
Line 12, Shanghai Metro
Shanghai Metro stations in Yangpu District
Railway stations in China opened in 2013